The Indefatigable gas field is a large natural gas and associated condensate field located under the North Sea 60 miles (98 km) off the Norfolk coast.

The field 
The indefatigable gas field is a natural gas field located in the North Sea. The field is 67 miles (107 km) north-east of Great Yarmouth and is named after the Indefatigable Banks a shallow sand bank beneath which it is situated. The gas reservoir is a Rotliegendes sandstone 200–300 feet (61–91 m) thick at a depth of 8000–9000 feet (2440–2740 m).  It was discovered in June 1966 and extends over several blocks: 49/18, 49/19, 49/23 and 49/24. The original determination of the gas in place amounted to 126 billion cubic metres. Blocks 49/18 and 49/23 were originally licensed to Amoco (since 2003 to Perenco UK Limited) and Block 49/19 and 49/24 to Shell. Production from the field began in September and October 1971. Gas and associated condensate are produced via the Leman gas field to the Bacton Gas terminal, Norfolk. 

The Indefatigable gas composition and properties are as follows.

Baird gas field 
The Baird gas field is located in Block 49/23 and is licensed to Perenco (originally Amoco). It was discovered in September 1993 and has recoverable reserves of 1.82 billion cubic metres. Gas is produced via a seabed well assembly and a pipeline to Inde 49/23 D. The peak production was 0.66 billion cubic metres per year.

Development 
The Indefatigable field has been developed through a number of offshore installations.

The Inde installations developed by Amoco, now owned by Perenco, were: 

The Perenco Indefatigable 49/23A complex also receives gas from other fields and third parties:

 Bessemer (49/23E) installation and its satellite N.W. Bell (49/23-9) via a 14.5 km 16-inch pipeline.
 Wenlock (49/12A) installation owned by Alpha Petroleum via a 36.231 km 8-inch pipeline. A three well-slot installation was installed in the Wenlock field in 2006 with wells commissioned in 2007, 2008 and 2009. Production declined quickly and make the installation uneconomic and a Decommissioning Programme  application was submitted to the Oil & Gas Authority in 2021.
 Davy (49/30A) installation and its satellites Davy North (49/30A-7A) and Davy East (53/5B-7) via a 43 km 16-inch pipeline.

The Inde installations developed by Shell were:

Production from the Shell Inde field ceased in 2005, Inde J, K, L, M, and N were subsequently decommissioned and removed.

Production 
The annual gas production from the Shell Indefatigable field (in million standard cubic feet) was:

See also 
 Leman gas field
 Hewett gas field
West Sole gas field
Viking gas field
Sean gas field
Davy, Bessemer, Beaufort, Brown and Boyle gas fields

References 

Natural gas fields in the United Kingdom
North Sea energy